Atenizus is a genus of beetles in the family Cerambycidae, containing the following species:

 Atenizus capixaba Martins, 1981
 Atenizus castaneus Martins, 1981
 Atenizus hylaeanus Martins, 1981
 Atenizus laticeps Bates, 1867
 Atenizus plaumanni Tippmann, 1960
 Atenizus simplex Bates, 1884
 Atenizus taunayi Melzer, 1920

References

Xystrocerini